The Incheon Hyundai Steel Red Angels Women's Football Club is a South Korean women's football team based in Incheon. The club was founded in 1993.

The club has won ten consecutive WK League titles from 2013 to 2022.

Current squad

Backroom staff

Coaching staff
Manager:  Kim Eun-sook
Head coach:  Jeong Sang-nam
Goalkeeper coach:  Lee Kwang-seok
Fitness coach:  Park Neong-kul

Support staff
Medical trainer:  Kim Eun-myung
Medical trainer:  Lee Seon-hee
Analyst:  Lee Ju-han
Interpreter:  Kim Sae-romi

Source: Official website

Honours
WK League
Winners (10): 2013, 2014, 2015, 2016, 2017, 2018, 2019, 2020, 2021, 2022
Runners-up (4): 2009, 2010, 2011, 2012

Records

Year-by-year

Record in AFC Women's Club Championship
All results list Incheon's goal tally first.

References

External links
 Official website 

Women's football clubs in South Korea
Association football clubs established in 1993
Sport in Incheon
WK League clubs
Hyundai Motor Group
1993 establishments in South Korea